Aydin Suleymanli (born 22 March 2005) is an Azerbaijani chess grandmaster (2021).

Biography
Aydin Suleymanli repeatedly represented Azerbaijan at the European Youth Chess Championships and World Youth Chess Championships in different age groups, where he won three gold medals: in 2013, in Budva at the European Youth Chess Championship in the U08 age group and was awarded the Candidate master (CM) title, In 2017, he won the European Youth Chess Championship in the U12 age group in Mamaia and was awarded the title of FIDE Master (FM). 

In 2014, in Tallinn he won European Youth Chess Championships in blitz and rapid in the U10 age group. 

In 2019, he won World Youth Chess Championship in O14 age group.

In February 2020 Suleymanli came first in the Aeroflot Open. In 2021, he won the Niksic Memorial with a score of 8/9. In the 8th round of the competition, he won against local chess player Luka Drašković. Due to this victory, at the age of 16, he became the 27th grandmaster of Azerbaijan.

Personal life
His current coach is GM Farid Abbasov. Aydin Suleymanli is one of the first to apply the Web3 trend in chess. Suleymanli offers fans a modern fan experience through its exclusive NFT collection.

References

External links

Aydin Suleymanli chess games at 365Chess.com

2005 births
Living people
Chess players from Baku
Chess grandmasters